Edmondson is a town in Crittenden County, Arkansas, United States. The population was 427 at the 2010 census.

Geography
Edmondson is located in south-central Crittenden County at  (35.103619, -90.308190).

Demographics

As of the census of 2000, there were 513 people, 174 households, and 140 families residing in the town.  The population density was 60.9/km2 (157.7/mi2).  There were 198 housing units at an average density of 23.5/km2 (60.9/mi2).  The racial makeup of the town was 27.49% White, 71.15% Black or African American, 0.58% Native American, 0.19% from other races, and 0.58% from two or more races.  0.39% of the population were Hispanic or Latino of any race.

There were 174 households, out of which 42.5% had children under the age of 18 living with them, 47.7% were married couples living together, 26.4% had a female householder with no husband present, and 19.0% were non-families. 15.5% of all households were made up of individuals, and 5.7% had someone living alone who was 65 years of age or older.  The average household size was 2.95 and the average family size was 3.29.

In the town, the population was spread out, with 35.9% under the age of 18, 9.0% from 18 to 24, 25.7% from 25 to 44, 18.5% from 45 to 64, and 10.9% who were 65 years of age or older.  The median age was 29 years. For every 100 females, there were 98.1 males.  For every 100 females age 18 and over, there were 90.2 males.

The median income for a household in the town was $28,056, and the median income for a family was $30,000. Males had a median income of $29,000 versus $17,917 for females. The per capita income for the town was $14,143.  About 21.5% of families and 24.6% of the population were below the poverty line, including 31.9% of those under age 18 and 22.2% of those age 65 or over.

Education
Edmondson is served by the West Memphis School District, which operates Academies of West Memphis (formerly West Memphis High School).

References

External links
Crittenden County website

Towns in Crittenden County, Arkansas
Towns in Arkansas
Memphis metropolitan area